Veit Ludwig von Seckendorff or Seckendorf (December 20, 1626December 18, 1692), German statesman and scholar, was a member of the House of Seckendorff, a noble family which took its name from the village of Seckendorf between Nuremberg and Langenzenn.
The family was divided into eleven distinct lines, widely distributed throughout Prussia, Württemberg, and Bavaria.

Biography 
Seckendorf, a son of Joachim Ludwig von Seckendorf, was born at Herzogenaurach, near Erlangen. In 1639, the reigning Swedish duke of Saxe-Coburg-Gotha, Ernest the Pious, made him his protégé, and he was educated at the Ernestine Gymnasium, Gotha. His father, was actively engaged in the Thirty Years' War and was executed at Salzwedel in 1642 for his dealings with the Imperialists of the Holy Roman Empire. Entering the University of Strasbourg in 1642, the means for Seckendorf's higher education came from Swedish officers who were former comrades of his father. He devoted himself to history and jurisprudence, and at the end of his university years Duke Ernest gave him a position as hofjunker in his court at Gotha, where Seckendorf laid the foundation of his great collection of historical materials and mastered the principal modern languages.

In 1652, Seckendorf was appointed to judicial positions and also sent on foreign missions. In 1656, he was made a judge in the ducal court at Jena and took the leading part in the numerous beneficent reforms of the duke. In 1664, Duke Ernest made him his chancellor, but soon afterwards he resigned his offices at Jena, while remaining on excellent terms with its Duke, and entered the service of Duke Maurice of Zeitz (Altenburg), with the intention of lightening his official duties.

After the death of Maurice in 1681, Seckendorf retired to his estate, Meuselwitz in Altenburg, resigning nearly all his public offices. Although living in retirement, he kept up a correspondence with the principal learned men of the day.  He was especially interested in the endeavours of the pietist Philipp Jakob Spener to effect a practical reform of the German church, although he was hardly himself a pietist. In 1692, he was appointed chancellor of the new University of Halle, but he died a few weeks afterwards.

Seckendorf's principal works were the following:
Teutscher Fürstenstaat (1656 and 1678), a handbook of German public law
Der Christen Stat (1685), partly an apology for Christianity and partly suggestions for the reformation of the church, founded on Pascal's Pensées and embodying the fundamental ideas of Spener
Commentarius Historicus et apologeticus de Lutheranismo sive de Reformatione (3 vols., Leipzig, 1692), occasioned by the Jesuit Maimbourg's Histoire du Luthéranisme (Paris, 1680), his most important work, and still indispensable to the historian of the Reformation as a rich storehouse of authentic materials.

Economic writings
Seckendorff is widely regarded as the "founder" of early economics in Germany of Cameralism. Having survived the horrors of the Thirty Years' War and the resulting economic, political and moral breakdown of society, Seckendorff conceived of a holistic science of public administration fit to reconstruct the more than 300 independent German principalities recognized by the Peace of Westphalia. The science he envisioned was both theoretical and practical, covering all the needs of a small principality. The same union of active and contemplative characterizes Seckendorff's own life, as he devoted himself both to administrating the Court of Gotha and the University of Halle, both to write an "owner’s handbook" (Teutscher Fürstenstaat, "The German Principality") to small principalities and one of the most celebrated defenses of Lutheranism.

Notes

References

Richard Pahner, Veit Ludwig von Seckendorff und seine Gedanken über Erziehung und Unterricht (Leipzig, 1892), the best sketch of Seckendorff's life, based upon original sources.
Theodor Kolde, "Seckendorf", in Herzog-Hauck's Realencyklopädie (1906).
Erik S. Reinert, "A Brief Introduction to Veit Ludwig von Seckendorff (1626–1692)", European Journal of Law and Economics, May 2005, Volume 19, Issue 3, pp 221–230.

External links
 Albion Small (1909), The Cameralists, pp. 60–94. The Pioneers of German Social Policy, Chicago: The University of Chicago

1626 births
1692 deaths
People from Herzogenaurach
German untitled nobility
German politicians
Cameralism